Alum Creek is a stream in Wilson County, Texas, in the United States. It is a tributary of Cibolo Creek.

Alum Creek was so named on account of the foul taste naturally occurring alum imparted in its water.

See also
List of rivers of Texas

References

Rivers of Wilson County, Texas
Rivers of Texas